The 1932 Washington Senators won 93 games, lost 61, and finished in third place in the American League. They were managed by Walter Johnson and played home games at Griffith Stadium.

Regular season 
The 1932 Washington Senators were the last team in the 20th century to have 100 triples in one season.

Season standings

Record vs. opponents

Roster

Player stats

Batting

Starters by position 
Note: Pos = Position; G = Games played; AB = At bats; H = Hits; Avg. = Batting average; HR = Home runs; RBI = Runs batted in

Other batters 
Note: G = Games played; AB = At bats; H = Hits; Avg. = Batting average; HR = Home runs; RBI = Runs batted in

Pitching

Starting pitchers 
Note: G = Games pitched; IP = Innings pitched; W = Wins; L = Losses; ERA = Earned run average; SO = Strikeouts

Other pitchers 
Note: G = Games pitched; IP = Innings pitched; W = Wins; L = Losses; ERA = Earned run average; SO = Strikeouts

Relief pitchers 
Note: G = Games pitched; W = Wins; L = Losses; SV = Saves; ERA = Earned run average; SO = Strikeouts

Farm system

References

External links 
1932 Washington Senators at Baseball-Reference
1932 Washington Senators team page at www.baseball-almanac.com

Minnesota Twins seasons
Washington Senators season
Wash